Founded in 2000, Philagrafika is a regional consortium of individuals and organizations interested in understanding the impact of the printed image in contemporary art. In April 2006 its founding name was changed from the Philadelphia Print Collaborative to Philagrafika, but its mission to promote and sustain printmaking as a vital and valued art form by providing artistic, programmatic and administrative leadership for large-scale, cooperative initiatives with broad public exposure remains the same. Building upon the region's rich history and abundant artistic resources, Philagrafika not only encourages a critical dialogue, but it continues to provide benefits for the local arts community by enhancing the city's presence as an international center for printmaking. All of this is realized through international contemporary art festivals, an annual invitational portfolio, and various notable public projects. Philagrafika's programs have been designed to promote new curatorial and critical models for printmaking-disciplines in which the medium is (re)presented as an integral component of current artistic practices.

Philagrafika 2010
In 2010 Philagrafika  produced the first international, multi-sited art exhibition and festival in Philadelphia that celebrated the printed image as a core strategy for artists today. Titled Philagrafika 2010, it debuted as one of the largest art events in the United States and the world's most important print-related exposition. Philagrafika artistic director, Jose Roca, led a team of curators from Philadelphia museums and galleries who developed a set of curated exhibitions that premiered in January 2010 and ran through April 2010 Philadelphia, Pennsylvania, United States. This region wide event joined prominent museums, cultural institutions, over 1000 artists, and a curatorial team to collaboratively forge the way for what will become a recurring event in Philadelphia.

Philagrafika 2010 was divided into three components. Housed in five local museums/galleries, The Graphic Unconscious  was the core exhibition, with over 35 artists from 18 countries. Out of Print, the second component matched five artists with five historic institutions in Philadelphia where they created new works inspired by that institutions unique collection. Seventy-five additional cultural institutions within Philadelphia organized the final component, Independent Projects . This component included an array of monographic, group, and thematic exhibitions that emphasized the printed image as its main tenet.

Contributing artists
The Graphic Unconscious

Eric Avery
Christiane Baumgartner
Erick Beltrán
Bitterkimix
Mark Bradford
Eloísa Cartonera
Sue Coe
Julius Deutschbauer
Dexter Sinister
Dispatch
Drive By Press
Art Hazelwood
Orit Hofshi
Thomas Kilpper
Gunilla Klingberg
Virgil Marti
Paul Morrison
Óscar Muñoz
Pepón Osorio
Carl Pope
Betsabeé Romero
Francesc Ruiz
Jenny Schmid
Self-Help Graphics & Art
Regina Silveira
Kiki Smith
Space 1026
Superflex
Swoon
Tabaimo
Temporary Services
Tromarama
Barthélémy Toguo
Young-Hae Chang Heavy Industries
Qiu Zhijie

Out of Print

Lisa Anne Auerbach
Cannonball Press
Enrique Chagoya
Pablo Helguera
Duke Riley

Independent Projects
For more information regarding the artists and venues involved in the Independent Projects component, please visit Independent Projects.

External links
 Philagrafika website
 Philagrafika 2010 website

Recurring events established in 2000
Art exhibitions in the United States
Organizations based in Philadelphia